John Arthur Stevens, Baron Stevens of Kirkwhelpington,  (born 21 October 1942) was Commissioner of Police of the Metropolis (head of the Metropolitan Police Service) from 2000 until 2005. From 1991 to 1996, he was Chief Constable of Northumbria Police before being appointed one of HM Inspectors of Constabulary in September 1996. He was then appointed Deputy Commissioner of the Met in 1998 until his promotion to Commissioner in 2000. He was a writer for the News of the World, for £7,000 an article, until his resignation as the hacking scandal progressed.

He sits in the House of Lords as a crossbencher.

Police career
Stevens was educated at St. Lawrence College, Ramsgate, the University of Leicester, where he took an LL.B, and the University of Southampton, where he did his MPhil. Before becoming Chief Constable of Northumbria, he served as Assistant Chief Constable of the Hampshire Constabulary (1986–88) and Deputy Chief Constable of the Cambridgeshire Constabulary (1988–91). 

He presided over an external police inquiry into allegations in Northern Ireland of collusion between the British Army, the Royal Ulster Constabulary and loyalist terrorists in the murders of Irish nationalists. Stevens's third report, published on 17 April 2003, upheld the claim and explicitly said that collusion leading to the murder of nationalists (and some unionists wrongly thought to be Catholic or nationalist) had taken place. In the aftermath of the report, David Trimble, then-leader of the Ulster Unionist Party, called for a parliamentary inquiry into the collusion, while the leaders of the SDLP and Sinn Féin called for a full public inquiry. A subsequent government ordered review by Sir Desmond de Silva, QC, announced in December 2012, confirmed the findings of the Stevens 1, 2 and 3 Inquiries regarding collusion between loyalist paramilitary groups and British intelligence in killings in Northern Ireland, which resulted in 97 convictions,  and a large number of recommendations, which were accepted.

Post-retirement
After his retirement as Commissioner of Police of the Metropolis, on 6 April 2005 he was created a life peer as Baron Stevens of Kirkwhelpington, of Kirkwhelpington in the County of Northumberland. He headed a Metropolitan Police inquiry, Operation Paget, into the death of Diana, Princess of Wales, on 31 August 1997, which reported its findings in 2006.

Lord Stevens was asked by the Conservatives, under David Cameron, to be their candidate for the London Mayoral elections. He declined this offer.

On 29 June 2007, having become one of the UK's leading security experts, in-coming Prime Minister Gordon Brown appointed Lord Stevens as his Senior Advisor on International Security Issues. David Cameron appointed Stevens as Chair of the Borders Policing Committee in 2007, a position he held for 9 months focusing on the reorganisation and policing of the UK's borders. In 2011, he was appointed by Yvette Cooper MP, Shadow Secretary of State for Home Affairs to Chair an Independent Commission Policing Commission into the Future of Policing in  England and Wales.

The Commission, which reported its findings in Spring 2013, was set up in place of a Royal Commission and is made up of nearly 40 members all of whom are experts in the fields of academia, politics, national and international policing/security as well as key figures from community initiatives and business. In addition the Commission has secured contributions from 35 academics from 25 Universities from around the world including, Oxford University, Cambridge University, Northumbria University and Harvard University. 

Lord Stevens became Honorary President of the Police Credit Union in 2007.

He is also Patron of the Police History Society.

Lord Stevens holds positions at a number of security consultancy companies. Since 2014, he has been Chairman of the private investigative and security consulting firm Quest Global Limited, where he is also a person with significant control. In 2020, Lord Stevens was forced to apologise when he was "found in breach of the House of Lords' code of conduct for failing to correctly declare his work for foreign governments" in connection with his position at Quest Global Limited and his other consultancy work. Quest Global Limited was also mentioned in connection with the alleged bugging of Sir Frederick Barclay at the London Ritz hotel in 2020 and the subsequent legal action brought by Sir Frederick and his daughter against other members of their family.

Honours
Awarded the Queen's Police Medal in the 1992 New Year Honours, he was knighted in the 2000 New Year Honours and made Deputy Lieutenant of London in 2001. In 2002 he was made a Knight of the Order of Saint John.

100px

100px

In April 2007 Lord Stevens became Honorary Air Commodore of No 3 (Royal Auxiliary) Air Force Police Squadron. He is the Honorary Colonel of Northumbria Army Cadet Force. On 28 November 2005, he was appointed Chancellor of Northumbria University. 

He holds an Honours Degree in Law, a master's degree of Philosophy, a Doctor of Law, Honorary Degrees of Doctor in Civil Law, Doctor of Letters and a Doctor of Philosophy. 

He is a Fellow of Wolfson College, Cambridge, and was a visiting professor at City University of New York (CUNY).

Lord Stevens holds a Commercial Pilot's Licence and is part owner of several aircraft.

Styles and honours
 Mr John Stevens (1942–1963)
 PC John Stevens (1963-through ranks, including Detective Chief Superintendent-1986)
 Assistant Chief Constable John Stevens (1986–1989)
 Deputy Chief Constable John Stevens (1989–1991)
 Chief Constable John Stevens (1991–1991)
 Chief Constable John Stevens QPM (1991–1998)
 Deputy Commissioner John Stevens QPM (1998–2000)
 Commissioner John Stevens QPM (2000)
 Commissioner Sir John Stevens QPM (2000–2001)
 Commissioner Sir John Stevens QPM DL (2001–2002)
 Commissioner Sir John Stevens KStJ QPM DL (2002–2005)
 The Lord Stevens of Kirkwhelpington KStJ QPM DL FRSA (2005–present)

Arms

Autobiography

See also
 Phone hacking scandal reference lists
 Metropolitan police role in phone hacking scandal

References

External links
 Profile on BBC website
 Download: Lord Stevens' 832-page Operation Paget Report Into The Death of Diana 14 December 2006
 John Stevens interviewed by John Kampfner on New Statesman 2 August 2004.

1942 births
Living people
Commissioners of Police of the Metropolis
Crossbench life peers
Life peers created by Elizabeth II
Deputy Lieutenants of the County of London
British Chief Constables
People educated at St Lawrence College, Ramsgate
Knights Bachelor
Knights of the Order of St John
Alumni of the University of Leicester
Alumni of the University of Southampton
People associated with Northumbria University
English recipients of the Queen's Police Medal
Place of birth missing (living people)